Norilsky Nickel is a professional futsal club competing in the Russian Futsal Super League.

Current squad 2013/14

Honours

National
Russian Super League (1) :
Champion : 2002

References

Futsal clubs in Russia
Norilsk